Gam is a sub-prefecture Mayo-Kebbi Est Region in Chad.

References 

Populated places in Chad